Los Homerun-es is a compilation album and fifth overall of Reggaeton recording artist Daddy Yankee. It came before Yankee's mainstream debut, Barrio Fino. This album releases Daddy Yankee's hits from the 1990s to 2003. This album was released on an independent record label on February 28, 2003. Following the success of Barrio Fino, the album was re-released on 2005. Even though it was an independent album, it featured other huge reggaeton artists, like Nicky Jam, Don Omar, Julio Voltio. Some songs were released with DJ Playero.

To promote the album, he toured for the first time in Panama, Nicaragua and Honduras. Los Homerun-es debut at the Top 10 of the US Billboard Latin Albums charts, marking his first album to do so and one of the few reggaeton albums to made it at the time. The lead single "Seguroski" become his first song to chart and gain moderate airplay in the United States. Following the success of the album, he also performed on the first reggeaton summer fest at the Madison Square Garden in New York and his first major show as a headliner artist at the Roberto Clemente Coliseum in San Juan, Puerto Rico in August 2003.

Track listing

 The original 2003 version had the intro and the song "Segurosqui" as separate tracks. Making the album have a total of 24 tracks.

DVD
"Los Homerun-es Radio Version (Segurosqui/Gata Gangster)-Daddy Yankee & Don Omar
"Baila Girl/Todo Hombre Llorando Por Ti/
"No Te Canses/El Funeral
"Camuflash(40)

Charts

References

Daddy Yankee compilation albums
2005 compilation albums
Albums produced by Rafy Mercenario